Zheng Kaimu (born January 28, 1992) is a professional Chinese footballer who currently plays as a defender or defensive midfielder for Chinese Super League side Cangzhou Mighty Lions.

Club career
While Zheng Kaimu was born in Huangshi, Hubei, he would move to Shanghai to join the Genbao Football Base where he spent several years studying before moving back to Hubei and joining the Wuhan Optics Valley youth team. Unfortunately for him, his club would decide to disband before he had the chance to graduate to the senior team, however luckily for Zheng the local Hubei government decided to form a new team using the Wuhan Optics Valley youth team and play within the third tier of the Chinese pyramid as Hubei Greenery. After only spending six months with the club Zheng would have the chance to return to Shanghai to join Genbao Football Base's senior football club Shanghai East Asia and play within the second tier. Zheng would, however have to wait until the following season before he made his debut for the club on April 22, 2010 in a league game against Hunan Billows in 2-1 defeat. By the end of the season Zheng would not be able to establish himself as regular member of the team and was allowed to leave the club to join third-tier club Chongqing F.C.

Within Chongqing F.C. Zheng would go on to establish himself as a regular within the squad as they won promotion and came runners-up within the league. His performances for Chongqing F.C. would attract the interests of top-tier club Shanghai Shenhua where he would go on to make his debut on March 10, 2012 in a league game against Jiangsu Sainty that ended in a 1-1 draw. On 15 February 2017, Zheng was loaned to League One side Shijiazhuang Ever Bright until 31 December 2017.

On 26 February 2018, Zheng transferred to fellow Chinese Super League side Guizhou Hengfeng. He made his debut on 4 March 2018 in a league game against Jiangsu Suning that ended in a 3-1 defeat. Zheng transferred to Super League side Tianjin TEDA in February 2019 after Guizhou Hengfeng relegated to the second-tier. Making his debut on 3 March 2019 in a league game against Jiangsu Suning, once again he was on the losing team as the match also saw him receive a red card as the game ended in a 3-2 defeat.

Career statistics
.

References

External links

1992 births
Living people
People from Huangshi
Chinese footballers
Footballers from Hubei
Wuhan F.C. players
Shanghai Port F.C. players
Shanghai Shenhua F.C. players
Cangzhou Mighty Lions F.C. players
Guizhou F.C. players
Tianjin Jinmen Tiger F.C. players
Chinese Super League players
China League One players
China League Two players
Association football defenders
Association football midfielders